Abel José Carvalho Pereira (born 15 April 1990) is a Portuguese footballer who plays for ADC Santa Marta de Penaguião as a right-back.

Club career
Born in Alijó, Vila Real District, Pereira started playing with Atlético Clube Alijoense in his hometown, at age 9. In 2006, he joined S.L. Benfica's under–17 team, where he completed his development.

After getting a professional contract, Pereira made his senior debut on loan at C.D. Mafra from the third division. Due to the lack of playing time, he moved to fellow league club C.D. Tondela for the remainder of the season, also on loan.

Pereira first reached the professional leagues when Benfica loaned him to Segunda Liga side C.D. Fátima for the 2010–11 campaign. However, after six months without making an appearance, he returned to the third tier with Gondomar SC.

In June 2011, Pereira was part of massive influx of Portuguese footballers to Doxa Katokopias FC in the Cypriot Second Division. He helped them promote to the First Division in his first year, and was regularly used the following seasons.

On 24 June 2014, Pereira returned to Portugal after signing a one-year deal with Varzim S.C. and reuniting with former Gondomar coach Vítor Paneira. After 18 months, which included promotion from division three, he re-signed with Doxa.

International career
Pereira won 15 caps for Portugal, across four youth levels. He helped the under–16 team reach the final of the Val-de-Marne Tournament in October 2005, and won the 2008 Lisbon International Tournament with the under–18s.

The following year, Pereira represented the under–19 side in the elite qualifying round of the 2009 UEFA European Championship, in which the nation did not progress.

Career statistics

References

External links

1990 births
Living people
People from Alijó
Portuguese footballers
Association football defenders
Liga Portugal 2 players
Segunda Divisão players
S.L. Benfica footballers
C.D. Mafra players
C.D. Tondela players
C.D. Fátima players
Gondomar S.C. players
Varzim S.C. players
Clube Oriental de Lisboa players
Casa Pia A.C. players
S.C.U. Torreense players
Cypriot First Division players
Cypriot Second Division players
Doxa Katokopias FC players
Portugal youth international footballers
Portuguese expatriate footballers
Expatriate footballers in Cyprus
Portuguese expatriate sportspeople in Cyprus
Sportspeople from Vila Real District